Bergdorf may refer to:

Bergdorf Goodman, a luxury goods department store based on Fifth Avenue in Midtown Manhattan in New York City
Munroe Bergdorf (born Ian Bergdorf, 1987), British activist and model

See also
Bergdorf Blondes, 2004 chick lit début novel of Plum Sykes
Munroe Bergdorf race row incident